Biskopsön (Bishop Island) is an island in the archipelago of Stockholm, Sweden. Nearby islands in the same region of the archipelago include Kastön and Svärtskär.

History 

According to August Strindberg, the Swedish author, the local people at his time told him that the island had been given its name because a bishop (Swedish: Biskop) had been murdered there.

References

External links

Biskopsön Skärgårdsstiftelsen
Biskopsön

Islands of the Stockholm archipelago